The Chapel of San Jacinto, formal name Ermita La Conquistadora de la Inmaculada Concepción, is a Roman Catholic chapel located in the town of Salcajá, Guatemala. It is said to have been founded by the Franciscans in 1524, the same year the Maya K'iche' kingdom was conquered by the Spanish conquistadores, and is claimed to be the first church built in Central America. Although there is no historical evidence to support that claim, the chapel can be considered a fine example of early Spanish colonial architecture.

References

Roman Catholic churches in Guatemala
16th-century Roman Catholic church buildings in Guatemala
Roman Catholic churches completed in 1524